William Rhodes (birth unknown – death unknown) was a Welsh professional rugby league footballer who played in the 1920s.

Playing career

International honours
Billy Rhodes won a cap for Wales while at Pontypridd in 1926.

County honours
Billy Rhodes played , i.e. number 2, and scored 2-tries in Monmouthshire's 14-18 defeat by Glamorgan in the non-County Championship match during the 1926–27 season at Taff Vale Park, Pontypridd on Saturday 30 April 1927.

Club career
Billy Rhodes made his début for Warrington on Saturday 18 December 1926, and he played his last match for Warrington on Saturday 30 March 1929.

References

External links
Statistics at wolvesplayers.thisiswarrington.co.uk

Monmouthshire rugby league team players
Place of birth missing
Place of death missing
Rugby league centres
Rugby league wingers
Wales national rugby league team players
Warrington Wolves players
Welsh rugby league players
Year of birth missing
Year of death missing